Viktor Sergeevich Kalinnikov, also Victor (– 23 February 1927), was a Soviet choral composer, conductor and pedagogue. He was the younger brother of the better-known symphonic composer Vasily Kalinnikov (1866–1901).

He studied at the seminary in Oryol, then at the Moscow Philharmonic School, taking oboe and music theory. He played in various theatre orchestras, and taught singing at schools in Moscow. From 1899 to 1901 he headed the orchestra of the Moscow Art Theatre.
Victor attended then taught at the Moscow Synodal School of Russian Orthodox Church music, where he composed 24 sacred choral settings for the Russian Orthodox All-Night Vigil and Divine Liturgy. From 1922 to 1926 he taught at the Moscow Conservatory. His compositions were popular and well received by critics. He died in Saltykovka, a suburb of Balashikha near Moscow.

Selected works

References

External links

1870 births
1927 deaths
People from Mtsensky District
People from Mtsensky Uyezd
Russian classical oboists
Male oboists
Russian composers
Russian male composers
Academic staff of Moscow Conservatory